The Criminal Defence Service Act 2006 (c 9) is an Act of the Parliament of the United Kingdom. It makes provision about legal representation funded as part of the Criminal Defence Service.

Sections 1 to 4 came into force on 2 October 2006.

Section 1 - Grant of rights to representation
This section amends Schedule 3 to the Access to Justice Act 1999.

Section 2 - Rights to representation: financial eligibility
This section amends sections 25 and 26 of, and Schedule 3 to, the Access to Justice Act 1999.

Section 3 - Rights to representation: contribution orders
Section 3(2) amends section 17 of the Access to Justice Act 1999. Section 3(3) inserts section 17A of that Act. Section 3(4) amends section 25 of that Act.

Section 4 - Consequential amendments
Section 4(1) amends the Attachment of Earnings Act 1971. Section 4(3) amends the Children and Young Persons Act 1969 and the Powers of Criminal Courts (Sentencing) Act 2000.

Section 5 - Short title, commencement and extent
This section came into force on 30 March 2006.

The Criminal Defence Service Act 2006 (Commencement) Order 2006 (S.I. 2006/2491 (C. 83)) was made under section 5(2).

References
Halsbury's Statutes,

External links
The Criminal Defence Service Act 2006, as amended from the National Archives.
The Criminal Defence Service Act 2006, as originally enacted from the National Archives.
Explanatory notes to the Criminal Defence Service Act 2006.

2006 in England
2006 in Wales
Acts of the Parliament of the United Kingdom concerning England and Wales
English criminal law
United Kingdom Acts of Parliament 2006